The hairy chiton (Chaetopleura papilio) is a species of chiton in the family Chaetopleuridae. It is a marine mollusc.

Distribution
This species is found from the central Namibian coast to False Bay in South Africa, intertidally to at least 20 m.

Description
The hairy chiton has brown and black banded valves. A darker stripe runs down the centre of the valves. It can grow up to 70 mm in total length. The girdle is covered with black spines.

Ecology
This is a solitary animal.

References

Chaetopleuridae
Molluscs of Africa
Chitons described in 1797